Conchita Martínez was the defending champion, but lost in the first round to Nathalie Tauziat.

Anke Huber won the title by defeating Mary Pierce 6–0, 6–7(4–7), 7–5 in the final.

Seeds

Draw

Finals

Top half

Bottom half

References

External links
 Official results archive (ITF)
 Official results archive (WTA)

Advanta Championships of Philadelphia
1994 WTA Tour